Francesco Maria Imperiale (Sampierdarena, 21 August 1653Sampierdarena, 4 August 1736) was the 141st Doge of the Republic of Genoa and king of Corsica.

Biography 
Son of Gian Giacomo Imperiale and Livia Salvago, and member of the noble Imperiale family, Francesco Maria was born in 1653.

Senator of the Republic in 1697 and member of the Major Council from 1709 to 1711, Francesco Maria Imperiale was elected doge of the Republic of Genoa on 22 September 1711, the ninety-sixth in two-year succession and the one hundred and forty-first in republican history. As doge he was also invested with the related biennial office of king of Corsica. For the dogal appointment he had to renounce the feudal possessions of the "State of Sant'Angelo" - including Sant'Angelo dei Lombardi, Nusco, the lands of Lioni, Andretta and Carbonara,  which were administered by his brother Enrico in favor of his son Giulio.

He ended his term on September 22, 1713. He probably still fulfilled other public assignments until his death in the Villa Imperiale Scassi of Sampierdarena on August 4, 1736. He was buried in the basilica of San Siro. He was married to Silvia Centurione Oltremarini.

See also 
 Republic of Genoa
 Doge of Genoa

References 

18th-century Doges of Genoa
1653 births
1736 deaths
People from Sampierdarena